Korenbeurs may refer to:

 Korenbeurs (Amsterdam), a 17th-century commodity market in Amsterdam
 Korenbeurs (Groningen), a neoclassical building in Groningen